Granopupa is a genus of air-breathing land snails in the subfamily Granariinae of the family Chondrinidae.

The species of this genus are found in Western Europe and Mediterranean.

Species:
Granopupa granum 
Granopupa somaliensis

References
 

Chondrinidae